Cleora is a genus of moths in the family Geometridae. The genus was erected by John Curtis in 1825.

Species
 Cleora alienaria (Walker, 1860)
 Cleora acaciaria (Boiduval, 1833)
 Cleora atriclava Prout, 1926
 Cleora biclavata (D. S. Fletcher, 1953)
 Cleora cinctaria (Denis & Schiffermüller, 1775) – ringed carpet
 Cleora cnephaea Prout, 1915
 Cleora concentraria (Snellen, 1877)
 Cleora contiguata (Moore, [1868])
 Cleora costiplaga (D. S. Fletcher, 1953)
 Cleora cucullata (D. S. Fletcher, 1953)
 Cleora decisaria (Walker, 1866)
 Cleora determinata (Walker, 1860)
 Cleora displicata (Walker, 1860)
 Cleora eugraphica (Turner, 1917)
 Cleora fortunata Blachier, 1889
 Cleora fraterna (Moore, 1888)
 Cleora godeffroyi (Butler, 1886)
 Cleora goldfinchi Prout, 1937
 Cleora illustraria (Walker, 1863)
 Cleora indiga (D. S. Fletcher)
 Cleora inelegans (Warren, 1905)
 Cleora injectaria (Walker, 1860)
 Cleora inoffensa (Swinhoe, 1902)
 Cleora insolita (Butler, 1878)
 Cleora lacteata (Warren, 1897)
 Cleora lanaris (Butler, 1886)
 Cleora leucophaea (Butler, 1878)
 Cleora licornaria (Guenée, 1857)
 Cleora mjoebergi Prout, 1926
 Cleora munditibia Prout, 1927
 Cleora nigronotaria (Wileman, 1911)
 Cleora onycha (D. S. Fletcher, 1953)
 Cleora panagrata (Walker, 1862)
 Cleora pendleburyi Prout, 1929
 Cleora perfumosa (Warren, 1896)
 Cleora perlepidaria (Warren, 1900)
 Cleora processaria Walker
 Cleora projecta (Walker, 1860) – projected gray
 Cleora propulsaria (Walker, 1860)
 Cleora pupillata (Walker, 1860)
 Cleora repetita (Butler, 1882)
 Cleora repulsaria (Walker, 1860)
 Cleora rostrata (D. S. Fletcher, 1953)
Cleora rothkirchi (Strand, 1914)
 Cleora sabulata (D. S. Fletcher, 1953)
 Cleora samoana (Butler, 1886)
 Cleora scriptaria (Walker, 1860) – kawakawa looper
 Cleora sublunaria (Guenée, 1857) – double-lined gray
 Cleora tamsi D. S. Fletcher, 1967
 Cleora taprobana D. S. Fletcher, 1953
 Cleora tenebrata (D. S. Fletcher, 1953)
 Cleora thyris D. S. Fletcher, 1967
 Cleora tora Prout, 1926
 Cleora toulgoetae (Herbulot, 1961)
 Cleora transversaria (Pagenstecher, 1907)
 Cleora tulbaghata (Felder & Rogenhofer, 1875)
 Cleora undaria (Fabricius, 1794)
 Cleora viettei (Herbulot, 1958)

References 
 
 

 
Boarmiini
Geometridae genera